Hemisaurida (meaning "half lizard") is a genus of prehistoric ray-finned fish, known from Cretaceous fossils found in Europe.

References
 

Prehistoric aulopiformes
Cretaceous fish of Europe
Cretaceous bony fish
Prehistoric ray-finned fish genera